The culture of Nepal encompasses the various cultures belonging to the 125 distinct ethnic groups present in Nepal. The culture of Nepal is expressed through music and dance; art and craft; folklore; languages and literature; philosophy and religion; festivals and celebration; foods and drinks.

Dance and music

Legends state that dances in this country originated in the abode of Lord Shiva — the Himalayas, where he performed the tandava dance. This indicates that dance traditions of Nepal are very ancient and unique. With altitudes and ethnicity, the dances of Nepal slightly change in style as well as in the costumes. The Dishka, a dance performed at weddings, includes intricate footwork and arm movements. Accompanying music and musical instruments change in tune with the themes, which revolve around topics like harvesting of crops, marriage rites, war stories, a lonely girl's yearning for her love, and several other themes and stories from everyday life in the villages. The famous Tharu stick dances and the crazy peacock dance are two highlights, but there are plenty of other surprises. Expect to be invited to join in the dancing, as the evening reaches its climax.

Languages

As many as 123 languages are spoken in Nepal according to the 2011 census. Most of them belong to either the Indo-Aryan or the Tibeto-Burman language families. The major languages of the country (percent spoken as mother tongue) are Nepali (44.6%), Maithili (11.7%), Bhojpuri(6%), Tharu (5.8%), Tamang (5.1%), Nepal Bhasa (3.2%), Magar (3%) and Bajjika (3%), Magar (3%), and Doteli (3%).

Nepali, written in Devanagari script, is the official national language and serves as lingua franca among Nepalese ethnolinguistic groups.

Religions and philosophy

The 2011 census identified 81.6% of the population being Hindu. Buddhism was practiced by about 9% of the population. About 4.2% practice Islam and 3.6% of the population follows the indigenous Kirant religion. Christianity is practiced officially by less than 1.0%.

Hindu and Buddhist traditions in Nepal go back more than two millennia. In Lumbini, Buddha was born, and Pashupatinath temple, Kathmandu, is an old and famous Shiva temple of Hindus. Nepal has several other temples and Buddhist monasteries, as well as places of worship of other religious groups. Traditionally, Nepalese philosophical thoughts are ingrained with the Hindu and Buddhist philosophical ethos and traditions, which include elements of Kashmir Shaivism, Nyingma school of Tibetan Buddhism, works of Karmacharyas of Bhaktapur, and tantric traditions. Tantric traditions are deep-rooted in Nepal, including the practice of animal sacrifices. Five types of animals, always male, are considered acceptable for sacrifice: water buffalo, goats, sheep, chickens, and ducks. Cows are very sacred animals and are never considered acceptable for sacrifice  .

Festivals and celebrations

Several of the festivals of Nepal last from one to several days. As a predominantly Hindu and Buddhist nation, most of the Nepalese festivals are religious ones. The festivals of Nepal have their roots in Hinduism as more than 80% of the population of the country is Hindu. Buddhism, the second-largest religion of the nation which accounts for 9% of the population, has influenced the cultural festivals of Nepal. Dashain or Vijaya Dashami is the longest and the most important festival of Nepal. Generally, Dashain falls in late September to mid-October, right after the end of the monsoon season. It is "a day of Victory over Demons". The Newars celebrate the festival as Mohani, Tihar or Dipawali, Holi, Saraswati Puja, Rakshabandhan, Janmashtami, Gai Jatra, Nag Panchami, Teej, Chhath, Kartik Poornima, Maghe Sankranti, or Makar Sankranti Maha Shivratri and Chhechu are widely celebrated important festivals of Nepal. New Year's Day of the lunar calendar Nepal Sambat occurs in November. Several Jatras take place throughout the year and public holidays are declared in some regions.

Other important festivals include Buddha Purnima (the celebration of the birth of Buddha) Maha Shivaratri (a festival of Lord Shiva) and during Maha Shivaratri festivities, some people consume excessive drinks  and smoke charas. Sherpas, mostly located at higher altitudes and in the Mount Everest region, celebrate Mani Rimdu, for the good of the world.

Most festivals include dancing and music, and a variety of special foods are consumed during festivals and on special occasions.

The Sagan ceremony is the ritualized presentation of five food items (boiled egg, smoked fish, meat, lentil cake and rice wine) to a person which is done to bring good fortune as per Tantric tradition.

Available from: https://www.welcomenepal.com/plan-your-trip/culture.html Nepal Tourism Board, 2020, Culture of Nepal. Retrieved April 2, 2020|Customs

Available from: https://www.welcomenepal.com/plan-your-trip/culture.html Nepal Tourism Board, 2020, Culture of Nepal. Retrieved April 2, 2020|"There are various sets of customs in Nepal. Most of the customs go back to the Hindu, Buddhist or religious traditions. Marriage is an interesting rule in the religions in which it is done by the parents after their children came of age.

Available from: https://www.welcomenepal.com/plan-your-trip/culture.html Nepal Tourism Board, 2020, Culture of Nepal. Retrieved April 2, 2020|In Nepal, killing cows is illegal and considered a Universal Mother, symbolizing motherhood, charity, and piety. "Non-violence" is an important component of Hinduism, Buddhism and Jainism. In temple, people are asked to take off your  shoes to make the pure interiors clean. Some temples are forbidden to non-Hindus. Food habits is also different from region to region and much of Nepal food has been influenced by Indian and Tibetan styles of cooking. The most popular cuisine for Nepali to eat is The Thakalis which include the same daal and bhat. The regular Nepali food includes daal, bhat, tarkari and often pickle. Curried meat is also very popular but some saved it for special occasions. Momos is also the most popular snack among Nepalis. Roti and dhedo are also the famous cuisine in Nepalese homes."l
Nepal Tourism Board, 2020, Culture of Nepal. Retrieved April 2, 2020]

Architecture and archaeology

Nepal Sampada Sangha (Nepal Heritage Society) has compiled an inventory of 1,262 significant architectural and archeological sites in Nepal outside Kathmandu Valley.

Sports

The government declared volleyball as the national game of the country. Before it used to be dandi biyo.

A Cabinet meeting held at the Prime Minister Pushpa Kamal Dahal's residence in Baluwatar took the decision. The Ministry of Youth and Sports had put the proposal to declare volleyball as the national game. Nepal Volleyball Association had been demanding that the sport, which is played in all 75 districts of the country, should be the national game.

National Sports Council's former Member Secretary Yubaraj Lama had initiated the process of deciding the national game, while the current Member Secretary Keshab Kumar Bista had recommended for the national game.

Gallery

See also

 Boudhanath
 Chitrakar
 Cinema of Nepal
 Dhunge Dhara
 Languages of Nepal
 Media of Nepal
 Menstruation hut
 Music of Nepal
 Naga Panchami
 National Museum of Nepal
 Nepal Bhasa literature
 Nepalese architecture
 Nepalese cuisine
 Nepali literature
 Newa art
 Religion in Nepal
 Thangka
 Traditional Newar clothing

References

Further reading
 Kramrisch, Stella. "The Art of Nepal and Tibet." Philadelphia Museum of Art Bulletin 55.265 (1960): 23–38.
 Hutt, Michael. Nepal: A guide to the art and architecture of the Kathmandu Valley. Kiscadale Publications, 1994.
 Pal, Pratapaditya. Art of Nepal: a catalogue of the Los Angeles County Museum of Art collection. Univ of California Press, 1985.
 von Schroeder, Ulrich. Nepalese Stone Sculptures. Volume One: Hindu; Volume Two: Buddhist. (Visual Dharma Publications, 2019).

External links
 culture in nepal
 Nepal Encyclopedia culture category
 Culture, religions and festivals of Nepal
 Ethnic groups of Nepal
 Languages of Nepal
 Literature of Nepal
 Nepal Travel information
 Photographs of Heritage Sites of Nepal
 Nepal Handicraft Products

 Nepal
Folklore by country
Folklore by region